The Voice  เสียงจริงตัวจริง, (also known as The Voice Thailand) is a Thai reality television series on the Channel 3 television network. It premiered on 9 September 2012 on Channel 3. The format is adapted from the original Dutch version, The Voice of Holland. The program was commissioned after a successful first season in the United States, where the program aired on NBC domestically, and AXN Asia regionally. It is produced by True Music and Toh-Klom Televisions. After producing six seasons, in 2018, the show was acquired by PPTV HD for two seasons. After 2 years passed, during the COVID-19 pandemic, The Voice Thailand come back with the "All Stars" season in One31.

Format 

The Voice is a reality television series that features four coaches looking for a talented new artist, who could become a global superstar. The show's concept is indicated by its title: the coaches do not judge the artists by their looks, personalities, stage presence, or dance routines, only their vocal ability. It is this aspect that differentiates The Voice from other reality television series such as The X Factor, Britain's Got Talent or even Must Be the Music. In the Blind auditions, the competitors are split into four teams, which are mentored by the coaches. If a coach likes what they hear, a button-press allows their chair to spin around and face the performer, signifying that they would like to mentor them. If more than one does so, then the artist selects a coach. However, if no coach turns around then the artist is sent home. There are five different stages: producers' auditions, blind auditions, battles, knockouts, and live shows.

Coaches and contestants

Coaches

Contestants
 Winning coach and/or contestant, with winners in bold
 Runner-up coach and/or contestant
 3rd place coach and/or contestant
 4th place coach and/or contestant

Season summary

The Voice Kids 
The Voice Kids is a singing competition for children aged 7 to 14 years, and a junior version of The Voice Thailand. Following the success of the first season of The Voice Thailand, the series was produced after purchasing rights from Talpa Media Group in the Netherlands, making Thailand the sixth country to start producing The Voice Kids.

Series overview 
Warning: the following table presents a significant amount of different colors.

The Voice Senior 
The Voice Senior is a singing competition for contestants over the age of 60, being a senior version of The Voice Thailand. The series is produced by PPTV 36 after acquiring the show from the original Dutch version. Also, this is the first The Voice Senior of Asia.

Series overview

The Voice All Stars 
After a 2-year break because of the COVID-19 pandemic, The Voice Thailand announced through Instagram and other social media platforms that they will be broadcasting an All-Star edition in July, which is the first in Asia (second to air, because the Indonesian version has aired first even it announced later). The show will occur by One 31 instead of PPTV 36. This season will join by former contestants, former coaches and winners in every season. The coaches are Kong Saharat, Jennifer Kim, Joey Boy, Pop Pongkul.

External links
The official website

The Voice Thailand
2012 Thai television series debuts
Thai reality television series
2010s Thai television series
Channel 3 (Thailand) original programming
PPTV original programming